Luke Harris (born 4 March 2005) is a Welsh professional footballer who plays as a midfielder for Premier League club Fulham.

Personal life
Born in Jersey, Harris attended St. Clement School on the island.
He also attended Le Rocquier School as well as Coombe Boys' school.

Career
Harris received headlines when he scored a hat-trick in eleven minutes for Fulham’s under-23 side against Newcastle United under-23’s in February 2022. In the summer of 2022 he attended summer training camps and played friendlies with the Fulham first team. Harris was named in the starting eleven for the Fulham
first team for the first time on 23 August 2022 for an EFL Cup match away against Crawley Town. In September 2022 Harris was rewarded with a new professional contract with Fulham lasting until 2025, and began training daily with the first team squad. First team manager Marco Silva described him as “an offensive midfielder. He has one thing that is really important in football today — the ability to arrive in the box and score goals. It is something that is not easy to find in a midfielder, to be in the right spots. He has it. It’s up to us to keep working with him and to make him grow in the other aspects. That will be important for him.” Harris made his Premier League debut on 20 October 2022 appearing as a substitute in a 3-0 home win over Aston Villa.

International
Harris has captained the Welsh under-17 international age group side, and was called up for the Wales under-19’s for the 2022 UEFA European Under-19 Championship Group 10 qualifying matches in Norway against Georgia, Norway and Kosovo on 6, 9 and 12 October 2021.

In September 2022 Harris was called up to the senior Wales squad for the UEFA Nations League matches against Belgium and Poland on 22 and 25 September 2022.

In February 2023, Harris was awarded the 'Rising Star Award' at the 2022 CI Sports Awards.

Career statistics

References

External links
 
 

Living people
2005 births
Welsh footballers
Fulham F.C. players
Jersey footballers
Wales youth international footballers
Premier League players